The Geprüfte Sicherheit ("Tested Safety") or GS mark is a voluntary certification mark for technical equipment. It indicates that the equipment meets German and, if available, European safety requirements for such devices. The main difference between GS and CE mark is that the compliance with the European safety requirements has been tested and certified by a state-approved independent body. CE marking, in contrast, is issued for the signing of a declaration that the product is in compliance with European legislation. The GS mark is based on the German Product Safety Act ("Produktsicherheitsgesetz", or "ProdSG").

Testing for the mark is available from many different laboratories, such as, DGUV Test the TÜV, Nemko and IMQ.

Although the GS mark was designed with the German market in mind, it appears on a large proportion of electronic products and machinery sold elsewhere in the world.

See also
 CE mark
 UL mark

References

External links
 UL GS

Certification marks
Product safety